Great Crosby, or Crosby, is a town in the Metropolitan Borough of Sefton in Merseyside, England.  It contains 100 buildings that are recorded in the National Heritage List for England as designated listed buildings.   Of these, two are listed at Grade II*, the middle of the three grades, and the others are at Grade II, the lowest grade.  The list includes listed buildings in the districts of Seaforth and Waterloo, but not those in the districts of Blundellsands and Little Crosby.

The area developed with the arrival of the railway in the middle of the 19th century, when the hamlet of Crosby Seabank was replaced by housing for the middle class.  Most of the listed buildings are substantial private houses, many of them in the terraces of Beach Lawn, Adelaide Terrace, Marine Crescent, and Marine Terrace.  The other listed buildings include churches and associated structures, schools, public buildings, public houses, a hotel, a cross, a former windmill, a fountain, a former cinema, and a war memorial with surrounding lamp standards.

Key

Buildings

See also
Listed buildings in Little Crosby

References
Citations

Sources

Listed buildings in Merseyside
Lists of listed buildings in Merseyside
Crosby, Merseyside